Security Shield (also known as SecurityShield) is a series of  rogue security software programs that asks for an amount of money to get the "full" version for protection against minor or non-existent viruses.

References

Rogue software